Madhavrao Jivajirao Scindia (10 March 1945 – 30 September 2001) was an Indian politician and a minister in the Government of India. He was a member of the Indian National Congress party.

Scindia was the son of Jiwajirao Scindia, the last ruling Maharaja of the princely state of Gwalior during the British Raj. Upon the death of his father in 1961, and under terms agreed to during the political integration of India, Scindia succeeded to a privy purse, certain privileges, and the use of the title "Maharaja of Gwalior," which lasted until 1971, whereupon all were abolished by the 26th Amendment to the Constitution of India.

Early life
Scindia was born in a Royal Maratha family, to the last ruling Maharaja of Gwalior, Jivajirao Scindia. He married Madhavi Raje Sahib Scindia , a daughter of Army General of Madhesh Province, Nepal. He underwent his schooling in Scindia School, Gwalior and thereafter went for higher studies in Winchester College and at New College, Oxford.

On his return from the UK, Scindia followed the political tradition set by his mother Vijaya Raje Scindia by joining politics. He was elected to the Lok Sabha in 1971 from the Guna constituency on a Bharatiya Jana Sangh ticket.

Career

Electoral victories
A nine-term member of the Lok Sabha, Madhavrao Scindia never lost an election since 1971, when he won for the first time from Guna constituency at the age of 26. He contested the election on the ticket of Bharatiya Jan Sangh (the precursor of the present day Bharatiya Janata Party), which his family had long patronised. When the Emergency, he fled the country into self-imposed exile in the United Kingdom. After he returned to India , he resigned from the Bharatiya Jan Sangh. He contested from Guna constituency as an independent candidate and won the seat a second time in spite of the wave in favour of the Janata Party. In the 1980 election, he switched allegiance to Indian National Congress and won from Guna a third time. In 1984, he was nominated as the Congress party's candidate from Gwalior in a last-minute manoeuvre to defeat the Bharatiya Janata Party's Atal Bihari Vajpayee, and won by a massive margin. After that Scindia contested from either Gwalior or Guna and won on each occasion.

Ministerial appointments
The 1984 election brought Scindia his first experience as a minister. He made his mark as an excellent administrator during his stint as Railways Minister (22 October 1986 – 1 December 1989) in the Rajiv Gandhi Ministry.

Prime Ministers P. V. Narasimha Rao made him Minister for Civil Aviation. He faced a turbulent period of agitation by the staff of the domestic carrier, Indian Airlines, and as part of a strategy of disciplining the workforce, he leased a number of aircraft from Russia. Early in 1992 one of these aircraft crashed, though without any loss of life, and Scindia promptly submitted his resignation. Although not known to be too finicky about such notions as ministerial accountability, the prime minister accepted his resignation. Scindia was later reinducted into the Cabinet in 1995 as Minister for Human Resource Development. Scindia is also credited with setting up the Indian Institute of Information Technology and Management (IIITM) at Gwalior as an institution of repute, which got renamed after Atal Bihari Vajpayee as ABV-IIITM.

Opposition Years
After the defeat of the Indian National Congress in the 1989 Indian general election, Scindia became a prominent member of the opposition. In 1990, after the fall of the V. P. Singh government, the Congress provided external support to the Samajwadi Janata Party (Rashtriya) government of Chandra Shekhar. Scindia was appointed president of the Board for Cricket in India (BCCI), a post he held until his 3-year term expired in 1993.

Rebellion and return
In 1996, he left the Congress party after being accused of bribery by prime minister PV Narasimha Rao. He founded the Madhya Pradesh Vikas Congress (MPVC), and along with Arjun Singh and other Congress dissidents formed the United Front government at the Centre. Scindia himself opted to stay out of the cabinet. In 1998, just before the Lok Sabha elections he merged the MPVC into the Congress party.  He won the 1998 Lok Sabha election from Guna.

Death 
Madhavrao Scindia died at the age of 56, in a plane crash in Motta village, which is on the outskirts of Mainpuri district of Uttar Pradesh, on 30 September 2001. The plane caught fire when it was above Bhainsrauli village. Being viewed as a future prime ministerial candidate before the 1999 Lok Sabha elections in the aftermath of the controversy over Sonia Gandhi's foreign origin, was on his way to address a rally in Kanpur.

All eight people on board the private plane (Beechcraft King Air C90) died in the crash. This included his personal secretary Rupinder Singh, journalists Sanjeev Sinha (The Indian Express), Anju Sharma (The Hindustan Times), Gopal Bisht, Ranjan Jha (Aaj Tak), pilot Ray Gautam and co-pilot Ritu Malik. The bodies were charred beyond recognition and taken by road to Agra, from where a special Indian Air Force aircraft, sent by Prime Minister Atal Bihari Vajpayee, brought the remains to New Delhi. The remains of Madhavrao Scindia were identified by his family, with the goddess Durga locket that he always used to wear.

The autopsies were conducted and other legal formalities completed at the All India Institute of Medical Sciences, New Delhi by Professor T D Dogra. His son Jyotiraditya Madhavrao Scindia was symbolically appointed the head of the family.

Styles
1945-1961- His Highness Yuvaraja Maharaj Shrimant Madhavrao Scindia Bahadur.
1961-1971-  His Highness Ali Jah, Umdat ul-Umara, Hisam us-Sultanat, Mukhtar ul-Mulk, Azim ul-Iqtidar, Rafi-us-Shan, Wala Shikoh, Muhtasham-i-Dauran, Maharajadhiraj Maharaja Shrimant Madhav Rao III Scindia Bahadur, Shrinath, Mansur-i-Zaman, Maharaja Scindia of Gwalior.

Ancestry

Notes

References

Bibliography
 

1945 births
2001 deaths
People educated at Winchester College
Alumni of New College, Oxford
Indian cricket administrators
People from Madhya Pradesh
Indian National Congress politicians
Madhavrao
Victims of aviation accidents or incidents in India
Railway Ministers of India
Scindia School alumni
Indian sports executives and administrators
India MPs 1971–1977
India MPs 1977–1979
India MPs 1980–1984
India MPs 1984–1989
India MPs 1989–1991
India MPs 1991–1996
India MPs 1996–1997
India MPs 1998–1999
India MPs 1999–2004
Lok Sabha members from Madhya Pradesh
People from Gwalior
Presidents of the Board of Control for Cricket in India
Civil aviation ministers of India
Education Ministers of India
Bharatiya Jana Sangh politicians
Accidental deaths in India